Ireland is an island in the North Atlantic Ocean.

Ireland may also refer to:

Polities currently located on Ireland
 Ireland, also known as the Republic of Ireland, a sovereign state
 Northern Ireland, a constituent country of the United Kingdom

Former political arrangements of Ireland
 Gaelic Ireland, the political order that existed in Ireland before the Norman invasion
 Lordship of Ireland, a nominally all-island state created in the wake of the Norman invasion of the east coast of Ireland in 1169
 Kingdom of Ireland, a state from 1541 to 1800, in personal union with England and Scotland
 Confederate Ireland (1642–1649), an Irish government that controlled about two thirds of Ireland during the Commonwealth (or Interregnum)
 Irish Republic (1798), a short-lived French client republic proclaimed during the Irish Rebellion of 1798
 Ireland (1801–1921), a constituent country of the United Kingdom from 1801 to 1921
 Irish Republic (1916), a short-lived unrecognised independent state that existed in parts of Dublin during Easter Week
 Irish Republic, an unrecognised independent state declared between 1919 and 1922
 Southern Ireland (1921–22), a constituent country of the United Kingdom from 1921 to 1922, established on the same day as Northern Ireland
 Irish Free State, a dominion from 1922 to 1937, comprising briefly all of Ireland and thereafter 26 of the island's 32 counties, ending when the state adopted the name "Ireland" in December 1937

Other places 

 Ireland, Bedfordshire, England
 Ireland, Nova Scotia, Canada
 Ireland, Indiana, United States
 Ireland, Texas, United States
 Ireland, Washington, United States
 Ireland, West Virginia, United States
 Ireland Island, Bermuda, Bermuda
 Ireland Wood, West Yorkshire, England
 Island of Ireland, part of the failed World Islands development in Dubai
 New Ireland (island), Papua New Guinea
 New Ireland Province, Papua New Guinea

People
 Ireland Baldwin (born 1995), American fashion model
 Ireland (surname), a surname (including a list of people with the name)

Other uses
 Justice Ireland (disambiguation)
 RMS Empress of Ireland, an ocean liner that sank in 1914 after a collision
 United Ireland, a political movement

See also
 Irish (disambiguation)
 Names of the Irish state
 Munster Republic